The Mannerism Stakes is a Melbourne Racing Club Group 3 Thoroughbred horse race for mares aged four years old and older, held under Set Weights conditions with penalties, over a distance of 1400 metres at Caulfield Racecourse in Melbourne, Australia in late February.  Prizemoney is A$200,000.

History

The registered race is named after Mannerism, who won the 1991 Australasian Oaks and 1992 Caulfield Cup.

Name
 1989–1994 - The Fashion Stakes
 1995–2014 - Mannerism Stakes
 2015 - Premier Signs Stakes

Grade
 1988–1992 -  Listed race
 1993 onwards - Group 3 race

Distance
 1996–1997 – 1411 metres

Venue
In 1996 and 2023 the event was held at Flemington Racecourse.

Winners

 2023 - Espiona 
 2022 - Flying Mascot 
 2021 - Rich Hips 
 2020 - Greysful Glamour 
 2019 - Jamaican Rain 
 2018 - Silent Sedition 
 2017 - Silent Sedition 
 2016 - †Tuscan Sling   
 2015 - Tycoon Tara 
 2014 - Bonaria
 2013 - Star Of Giselle
 2012 - Hi Belle
 2011 - Red Flair
 2010 - Tootsie
 2009 - Symphony Miss
 2008 - Catechuchu
 2007 - Seachange
 2006 - Kats Clause
 2005 - Lyrical Bid
 2004 - Royal Sash
 2003 - Galapagos Girl
 2002 - Spurn
 2001 - Typhoon Billie
 2000 - Londolozi
 1999 - Miss Jugah
 1998 - Blue Storm
 1997 - Red Nile
 1996 - Tolanda
 1995 - Laura's Express
 1994 - Princess Plume
 1993 - Tarare
 1992 - Val De Grace
 1991 - Princess Pushy
 1990 - Memphis Blues
 1989 - English Charm
 1988 - Even True

Notes:
† The race was won by Azkadellia but was disqualified by Racing Victoria because convicted criminal Peter Foster was the 'mastermind' behind an arrangement with her racing manager Ben Connolly to deceive stewards over the true ownership.

See also
 List of Australian Group races
 Group races

References

Horse races in Australia
Caulfield Racecourse
Sprint category horse races for fillies and mares